The North Macedonia women's national beach handball team is the national team of North Macedonia. It takes part in international beach handball competitions.

World Championships results
2008 – 10th place

References

External links
Official website
IHF profile

Women's national beach handball teams
Beach handball
Women's handball in North Macedonia